Orey Vazhi is a 1959 Indian Tamil language film directed by K. Shankar. The film stars Prem Nazir and M. N. Rajam. It was remade in Hindi as Shaadi (1962).

Plot 

Mohan is a brilliant lawyer. He was educated by his elder brother who sold the family properties to educate Mohan. Mohan marries the daughter of a judge. Conflicts arise within the family and after much twists and turns the family is united.

Cast 
The list is adapted from The Hindu article.

Prem Nazir
M. N. Rajam
S. V. Subbaiah
Sriranjani, Jr.
Tambaram N. Lalitha
‘Valayapathi’ G. Muthukrishnan
S. Ramarao
K. R. Chellam
Pakkirisami
K.M. Nambirajan
C.P. Kittaan
V.T. Kalyanam
Thiruvengadam
C.S. Desikan
S.K. Ramaraj
Raju
Kuppusami
Sivaraman

(Guest Artistes)
T. S. Balaiah
S. V. Sahasranamam
Dance Drama
Sayee Subbulakshmi

Production 
The film marked the debut of N. Vasudeva "Vasu" Menon as a film producer. Earlier, he had worked in the production department of AVM Productions. He later established his own studio, Vasu Studios, under which the film was produced, with K. Shankar directing. However, shooting took place at Gemini Studios.

Soundtrack 
Music was composed by R. Govardhanam and the lyrics were penned by Kannadasan. Lyrics for the dance drama were written by Thanjai N. Ramaiah Dass.

Release and reception 
Orey Vazhi was released on 6 March 1959. The film received positive reviews from a number of critics.

References

External links 
 

1950s Tamil-language films
1959 films
Films with screenplays by Javar Seetharaman
Indian black-and-white films
Indian drama films
Tamil films remade in other languages